Vitor Hugo Naum dos Santos (born 1 April 1999), commonly known as Vitinho, is a Brazilian footballer who currently plays as a forward for Red Bull Bragantino, on loan from Dynamo Kyiv.

Club career
On 31 August 2021, Vitihno signed a 5 year contract with Ukrainian club Dynamo Kyiv.

Career statistics

Club

Honours
Athletico Paranaense
Campeonato Paranaense: 2019, 2020
J.League Cup / Copa Sudamericana Championship: 2019
Copa do Brasil: 2019

References

External links
Athletico official profile 

1999 births
Living people
People from São José dos Campos
Brazilian footballers
Brazilian expatriate footballers
Association football forwards
Campeonato Brasileiro Série A players
Ukrainian Premier League players
Expatriate footballers in Ukraine
Brazilian expatriate sportspeople in Ukraine
Club Athletico Paranaense players
Red Bull Bragantino players
FC Dynamo Kyiv players
Footballers from São Paulo (state)